Miss Indonesia 2017 is the 13th edition of the Miss Indonesia pageant. It was held on April 22, 2017, at MNC Studio, Kebon Jeruk, Jakarta, Indonesia. Miss World 2016, Stephanie Del Valle of Puerto Rico attended the awarding night.

Natasha Mannuela as Miss Indonesia 2016 from Bangka-Belitung Islands crowned her successor, Achintya Holte Nielsen from West Nusa Tenggara. She represented Indonesia in Miss World 2017.

Judges 

 Liliana Tanoesoedibjo, founder and chairwoman of Miss Indonesia Organization.
 Peter F. Saerang, professional make-up and hairstylist.
 Noor Sabah Nael Traavik, wife of the ambassador of Norway to Indonesia.
 Wulan Tilaar Widarto, vice-chairwoman of Martha Tilaar Group.
 Ferry Salim, actor, entrepreneur, and ambassador of UNICEF to Indonesia.
 Maria Harfanti, Miss Indonesia 2015 from Yogyakarta Special Region

Result

Placements

Order Announcements

Top 15

 North Maluku §
 Bengkulu §
 North Kalimantan §
 Central Kalimantan §
 Jakarta SCR §
 West Nusa Tenggara §
 Maluku
 Yogyakarta Special Region
 South Sumatera
 Banten
 North Sulawesi
 West Kalimantan
 Jambi
 Central Java
 Aceh
§ Placed into the Top 15 by Fast Track

Top 5 

 West Nusa Tenggara
 Yogyakarta Special Region
 Bengkulu
 North Sulawesi
 Central Java

Fast Track Event
Fast track events held during preliminary round and the winners of Fast Track events are automatically qualified to enter the semifinal round. This year's fast track events include : Talent, Catwalk (Modeling), Sports, Nature and Beauty Fashion, Social Media, And Beauty with a Purpose.

Special Awards

Contestants
Contestants of Miss Indonesia 2017 from 34 Provinces in Indonesia.

References

External links 
 Official site

2017 beauty pageants
Miss Indonesia